The Sitcom Showdown is a British television quiz show hosted by Danny Baker. To date, it has run for one five-episode series, and was produced by UMTV for the UKTV Gold digital television channel.

Synopsis
Each episode features two teams of three - a 'superfan', their best friend, and a comedian/celebrity. Each team represents their favourite sitcom, and through numerous rounds of quizzes, challenges and good-old laughs, the teams collect points in order to crown an eventual 'winning' show. The show was conceived and developed by Baker who originally envisioned the winning team being allowed to show an episode of their favourite sitcom after the episode was over but such a concept never materialized. In a 2014 interview with Richard Herring Baker described the show as a "stinker" and "not the worst show there's ever been but it was close".

Episodes
 'Allo 'Allo! vs. Absolutely Fabulous
 The Vicar of Dibley vs. The Royle Family
 One Foot in the Grave vs. dinnerladies
 Yes Minister vs. Blackadder
 Fawlty Towers vs. Porridge

Celebrity team members
 'Allo 'Allo! - Steve Furst
 Absolutely Fabulous - Ian Lavender
 The Vicar of Dibley - Sue Perkins
 The Royle Family - Geoff Lloyd
 One Foot in the Grave - Stephen Frost
 dinnerladies - Linda Robson
 Yes Minister - Emma Kennedy
 Blackadder - Andy Goldstein
 Fawlty Towers - Rowland Rivron
 Porridge - Jenny Powell

External links

The Unofficial Porridge Website

2006 British television series debuts
2006 British television series endings
2000s British game shows